The 2023 UCI Asia Tour is the 19th season of the UCI Asia Tour. The season began on 13 November 2022 with the Tour de Okinawa and will end in October 2023.

The points leader, based on the cumulative results of previous races, wears the UCI Asia Tour cycling jersey.

Throughout the season, points are awarded to the top finishers of stages within stage races and the final general classification standings of each of the stages races and one-day events. The quality and complexity of a race also determines how many points are awarded to the top finishers, the higher the UCI rating of a race, the more points are awarded.

The UCI race classifications from highest to lowest are as follows:
 Multi-day events: 2.1 and 2.2
 One-day events: 1.1 and 1.2

Events

References

External links 
 

 
2023
UCI Asia Tour
UCI
Asia Tour